The Negros leaf warbler (Phylloscopus nigrorum) is a songbird species from the leaf warbler family (Phylloscopidae). It was formerly included in the "Old World warbler" assemblage.

It is found in the Philippines. Its natural habitats are subtropical or tropical moist lowland forest and subtropical or tropical moist montane forest.

References

Negros leaf warbler
Negros leaf warbler